Fluxiderma is a genus of gastrotrichs belonging to the family Chaetonotidae.

Species:

Fluxiderma concinnum 
Fluxiderma montanum 
Fluxiderma verrucosum

References

Gastrotricha